Royal City is a B-side compilation by Royal City, released on June 23, 2009, on Asthmatic Kitty.

Track listing
 "Here Comes Success"
 "Can't You Hear Me Calling"
 "Postcards"
 "A Belly Was Made for Wine"
 "Dog Song"
 "O You With Your Shirt"
 "Bad Luck"
 "The Nations Will Sing"
 "I Called But You Were Sleeping"
 "They Came Down"
 "Is This It?"
 "In the Autumn"

References

2009 albums
Royal City (band) albums
Asthmatic Kitty albums